Primulina halongensis is a plant in the family Gesneriaceae, native to Vietnam. The specific epithet halongensis is for Hạ Long Bay, where the species is found. It was formerly placed in the genus Chirita.

Description
Primulina halongensis grows as a perennial herb. The fruit is reddish brown.

Distribution and habitat
Primulina halongensis is endemic to Vietnam, where it is confined to the islands of Hạ Long Bay, a UNESCO World Heritage Site. Its habitat is in cracks and rocks near the sea to exposed scree higher up on the limestone islands.

References

halongensis
Endemic flora of Vietnam
Plants described in 2000